Whirlybird is a 2020 American documentary film by Matt Yoka. It competed in the US Documentary category at the 2020 Sundance Film Festival.

Summary 
The film explores two LA reporters, Zoey Tur and Marika Gerrard who were well known for witnessing an attempted murder during the Rodney King riots, and being the first camera crew to find O.J. Simpson's white Ford bronco cruising down an LA freeway. Significant portions of the film feature Tur as Bob Tur, before she came out as transgender in 2013.

Tur' and Gerrard's daughter, Katy Tur, is also an award-winning journalist. She is also featured in the film.

Release and reception 
Whirlybird had its world premiere at the Sundance Film Festival on January 26, 2020.

 The site's critical consensus reads, "Whirlybird might have benefited from a more patient approach, but it remains a fascinating -- and often thrilling -- look at what goes into making the news."

See also 
June 17th, 1994
O.J.: Made in America
LA 92

External links
Whirlybird on IMDb
Official trailer
Official website

References 

2020 films
American documentary films
Collage film
Films about television
Films set in the 1980s
Films set in the 1990s
Collage television
2020s English-language films
Transgender-related documentary films
2020 LGBT-related films
2020s American films